Sigurd Rydén (born 10 January 1910; died April 2005) was a Swedish curler.

Teams

References

External links
 
 (look at "RYDÉN, SIGURD T V")

1910 births

2005 deaths

Swedish male curlers

Swedish curling champions